Ling Meng, Ph.D., is a Chinese plant biologist in the Department of Plant and Microbial Biology at the University of California, Berkeley. She is currently a Postdoctoral Fellow at Lawrence Berkeley National Laboratory. She is best known for discovering a novel form of cellular communication in plants. 
Thioredoxin, while known to play an important role in biological processes such as cellular redox, is not fully understood in function. Meng's work at Berkeley has suggested that thioredoxin h9 is associated with the plasma membrane and is capable of moving from cell to cell through two important protein post-translation modifications: myristoylation and palmitoylation. She is the first to connect thioredoxin with the plasma membrane.

Meng received her M.A. in Statistics in 2009 at the University of California, Berkeley.  She received her Ph.D. in Agricultural and Environmental Chemistry in 2011 at the University of California, Berkeley.

Master's Thesis

Selected research papers

 S; Wong, L; Meng, L; Lemaux, P. G. Zhang (2002) Similarity of expression pattern of KN1 and ZmLEC1 during somatic and zygotic embryogenesis in maize (Zea mays L.), 191-194. In Planta.
 Bregitzer P, Zhang S, Lemaux PG Meng L (2003) Methylation of the exon/intron region in Ubi 1 Promoter Complex correlates with transgene silencing in Barley, 327-340. In Plant Molecular Biology.
 Lemaux PG Meng L (2003) A rapid and simple method for nuclear run-on transcription assay in plants. Plant Molecular Biology Reporter, 65-71. In Plant Molecular Biology Reporter.
 Chen C, Li L, Meng L, Singh, J, He Zh, and Lemaux PG Zhang S (2005) Evolutionary Expansion, Gene Structure, and Expression of the Rice Wall-Associated Kinase Gene Family, 1107-1124. In Plant Physiology.
 Ziv M, Lemaux, PG Meng L (2006) Nature of Stress and Type of Transgene Locus Influences Tendency of Transgenes to Silence in Barley, 15-28. In Plant Mol Biol.
 S, Gurel, E, Kaur, R, Wong, J, Meng L, Tan, H-Q, Lemaux, PG Gurel (2009) Efficient, Reproducible Agrobacterium-mediated Transformation of Sorghum Using Heat Treatment of Immature Embryos, 429-444. In Plant Cell Reports 28 (3).

References

External links
 Ling Meng's profile at Mendeley

Living people
University of California, Berkeley faculty
Chinese women botanists
21st-century Chinese botanists
Year of birth missing (living people)
Chinese women biologists
Chinese women chemists
University of California, Berkeley alumni
Chinese emigrants to the United States